2017 Champions League may refer to:

Football
2016–17 UEFA Champions League
2017–18 UEFA Champions League
2017 AFC Champions League
2017 CAF Champions League
2017 GCC Champions League